Polvo à Lagareiro is a Portuguese dish based on octopus, olive oil, potatoes (batatas a murro), grelos and garlic. Its origin is uncertain though it is a common dish on Trás-os-Montes Province. It is often served on Christmas Eve.

References

Portuguese cuisine